Elizabeth Raffald (1733 – 19 April 1781) was an English author, innovator and entrepreneur.
 
Born and raised in Doncaster, Yorkshire, Raffald went into domestic service for fifteen years, ending as the housekeeper to the Warburton baronets at Arley Hall, Cheshire. She left her position when she married John, the estate's head gardener. The couple moved to Manchester, Lancashire, where Raffald opened a register office to introduce domestic workers to employers; she also ran a cookery school and sold food from the premises. In 1769 she published her cookery book The Experienced English Housekeeper, which contains the first recipe for a "Bride Cake" that is recognisable as a modern wedding cake. She is also possibly the inventor of the Eccles cake.

In August 1772 Raffald published The Manchester Directory, a listing of 1,505 traders and civic leaders in Manchester—the first such listing for the up-and-coming town. The Raffalds went on to run two important post houses in Manchester and Salford before running into financial problems, possibly brought on by John's heavy drinking. Raffald began a business selling strawberries and hot drinks during the strawberry season. She died suddenly in 1781, just after publishing the third edition of her directory and while still updating the eighth edition of her cookery book.
 
After her death there were fifteen official editions of her cookery book, and twenty-three pirated ones. Her recipes were heavily plagiarised by other authors, notably by Isabella Beeton in her bestselling Mrs Beeton's Book of Household Management (1861). Raffald's recipes have been admired by several modern cooks and food writers, including Elizabeth David and Jane Grigson.

Biography

Early life

Raffald was born Elizabeth Whitaker in Doncaster, one of the five daughters of Joshua and Elizabeth Whitaker. Raffald was baptised on 8 July 1733. She was given a good schooling, which included learning French. At fifteen she began working in service as a kitchen maid, and rose to the position of housekeeper. Her final post as a domestic servant was at Arley Hall, Cheshire, North West England, where she was housekeeper for Lady Elizabeth Warburton, from the family of the Warburton baronets. Starting work in December 1760, Raffald was paid £16 a year. In all she spent fifteen years in service.
 
After a few years working for the Warburtons, Elizabeth married John Raffald, the head gardener at Arley Hall. The ceremony took place on 3 March 1763 at St Mary and All Saints Church, Great Budworth, Cheshire; on 23 April the couple left the Warburtons' service and moved to Fennel Street, Manchester, where John's family tended market gardens near the River Irwell. Over the following years, the couple had probably six daughters. The girls each had their own nurse, and when going out, were dressed in clean white dresses, with the nurses in attendance; at least three of the girls went to boarding schools.

Business career

John opened a floristry shop near Fennel Street; Raffald began an entrepreneurial career at the premises. She rented her spare rooms for storage, began a register office to bring together, for a fee, domestic staff with employers, and advertised that she was "pleased to give her business of supplying cold entertainments, hot French dishes, confectionaries, &c." Over the next few years her business grew, and she added cookery classes to the services she supplied. In August 1766 the Raffalds moved to what was probably a larger premises in Exchange Alley in Market Place. Here John sold seeds and plants, while Raffald, according to her advertisements in the local press, supplied "jellies, creams, possets, flummery, lemon cheese cakes, and all other decorations for cold entertainments; also, Yorkshire hams, tongues, brawn, Newcastle salmon, and sturgeon, pickles, and ketchups of all kinds, lemon pickles"; she also supplied the produce for, and organised, civic dinners. The following year, alongside confectionery, she was also selling:
 
pistachio nuts, French olives, Portugal and French plumbs, prunellos [prunes], limes, preserved pine apples, and all sorts of dry and wet sweetmeats, both foreign and English. Also Turkey figs and other raisins, Jorden and Valencia almonds ... truffles, morels and all sorts of spices.
 

In 1769 Raffald published her cookery book, The Experienced English Housekeeper, which she dedicated to Lady Warburton. As was the practice for publishers at the time, Raffald had obtained subscribers—those who had pre-paid for a copy. The first edition was supported by more than 800 subscribers which raised over £800. The subscribers paid five shillings when the book was published; the non-subscribers paid six. The book was "printed by a neighbour whom I can rely on doing it the strictest justice, without the least alteration". The neighbour was Joseph Harrop, who published the Manchester Mercury, a weekly newspaper in which Raffald had advertised extensively. She described the book as a "laborious undertaking" that had damaged her health as she had been "too studious and giving too close attention" to it. In an attempt to avoid piracy of her work, Raffald signed the front page of each copy of the first edition.
 
In the introduction to The Experienced English Housekeeper, Raffald states "I can faithfully assure my friends that ... [the recipes] are wrote from my own experience and not borrowed from any other author". Like her predecessor Hannah Glasse, who wrote The Art of Cookery Made Plain and Easy in 1747, Raffald did not "gloss ... over with hard names or words of high style, but wrote in ...[her] own plain language". The historian Kate Colquhoun observes that Glasse and Raffald "wrote with an easy confidence", and both were the biggest cookery book sellers in the Georgian era.
 
In 1771 Raffald released a second edition of The Experienced English Housekeeper, which included a hundred additional recipes. The publisher was Robert Baldwin of 47 Paternoster Row, London, who had paid Raffald £1,400 for the copyright of the book. When he asked her to change some of the Mancunian vernacular, she declined, stating "What I have written I proposed to write at the time; it was written deliberately, and I cannot admit of any alteration". Further editions of the book appeared during her lifetime: in 1772 (printed in Dublin), 1773, 1775 and 1776 (all printed in London).
 
In May 1771 Raffald advertised that she had begun to sell cosmetics from her shop, and listed the availability of distilled lavender water, wash balls, French soap, swan-down powder puffs, tooth powder, lip salve and perfumes. The historian Roy Shipperbottom considers that her nephew—the perfumer to the King of Hanover—was probably the supplier of the items. The same year she also assisted in setting up Prescott's Manchester Journal, the second Mancunian newspaper.
 

In August 1772 Raffald published The Manchester Directory, a listing of 1,505 traders and civic leaders in Manchester. She wrote, "The want of a directory for the large and commercial town of Manchester having been frequently complained about ... I have taken on the arduous task of compiling a complete guide". The following year a larger edition followed, also covering Salford.

At some point the Raffalds had also run the Bulls Head tavern—an important post house in the area, but in August 1772 the couple took possession of a coaching inn they described as:
 
the old accustomed and commodious inn, known by the sign of the Kings Head in Salford, Manchester, which they have fitted up in the neatest and most elegant manner, for the reception and accommodation of the nobility, gentry, merchants and tradesmen.
 
With a large function room at the premises, the Raffalds hosted the annual dinner of the Beefsteak Club and hosted weekly "card assemblies" during the winter season. Cox relates that Raffald's cuisine and her ability to speak French attracted foreign visitors to the inn. Raffald's sister, Mary Whitaker, opened a shop opposite the Kings Head and began selling the same produce Raffald had from the Fennel Street outlet; Mary also restarted the servants' register office.
 
The couple had problems at the Kings Head. John was drinking heavily and feeling suicidal; when he said he wanted to drown himself, Raffald replied "I do think that it might be the best step you could take, for then you would be relieved of all your troubles and anxieties and you really do harass me very much." Thefts at the inn were common and trade did not flourish; money problems—possibly because they had overstretched themselves with their business dealings over two decades—brought creditors with their demands for repayment. John, as all the financial dealings were in his name, settled the debts by assigning over all the couple's assets and leaving the Kings Head; he was declared bankrupt. They moved back to Market Place in October 1779 where they occupied the Exchange Coffee House. John was made master of the business and Raffald provided food, chiefly soups. During strawberry season she set up a business on the Kersal Moor Racecourse, near the ladies' stand, selling strawberries with cream, tea and coffee.
 

In 1781 the Raffalds' finances improved. Raffald updated The Manchester Directory and a third edition was published; she was compiling the eighth edition of The Experienced English Housekeeper and was writing a book on midwifery with Charles White, the physician and specialist in obstetrics. She died suddenly on 19 April 1781 of "spasms, after only one hour's illness"; the description is now considered to describe a stroke. The historian Penelope Corfield considers John's bankruptcy may have been a factor in Raffald's early death. She was buried at St Mary's Church, Stockport on 23 April.
 
A week after Raffald's death, John's creditors took action and he was forced to close the coffee shop and sell off all his assets; initially he attempted to let it as a going concern, but there were no offers, so the lease and all his furniture was handed over to settle the debts. The copyright for the midwifery manuscript seems to have been sold; it is not known if it was ever published, but if it was, Raffald's name did not appear in it. John moved to London soon after Raffald's death and "lived extravagantly", according to Cox. He remarried and returned to Manchester after his money had run out. He reformed on his return, and joined the Wesleyan Methodist Church, where he attended chapel for the next thirty years. He died in December 1809, aged 85 and was buried in Stockport.

Works

Cookery

For the first edition of The Experienced English Housekeeper, Raffald had tested all the recipes herself; for the second edition in 1771, she added 100 recipes, some of which she had bought and not tested, but, she informed her readers, she had "weighed them the best I could". Colquhoun considers that the recipes Raffald wrote were those that appealed to Middle England, including "shredded calves' feet, hot chicken pies and carrot puddings, poached eggs on toast, macaroni with parmesan, and lettuce stewed in mint and gravy". Raffald was, Colquhoun writes, typical of her time, as she did not want to use garlic, preferred to eat crisp vegetables, and used grated horseradish and cayenne pepper—the last of these Colquhoun describes as "the taste of Empire".
 
The Experienced English Housekeeper comprises recipes for food and drink only and, unlike many other cookery books of the time, there are no recipes for medicines or perfumes. The work contains one page with instructions for laying the table, and no instructions for servants. More than a third of the recipes in The Experienced English Housekeeper were given over to confectionery, including an early recipe for "Burnt Cream" (crème brûlée), details of how to spin sugar into sugar baskets and instructions of how to create multi-layered jellies, which included in them "fish made from flummery or hen's nests from thinly sliced, syrup poached lemon rind".
 
The food historian Esther Bradford Aresty considers that "fantasy was Mrs. Raffald's specialty", and cites examples of "A Transparent Pudding Cover'd with a Silver Web, and Globes of Gold with Mottoes in Them", "A Rocky Island", which has peaks of gilded Flummery, a sprig of myrtle decorated with meringue, and a calves-foot jelly sea. Colquhoun thinks some of the recipes are "just a bit bizarre", including the "Rabbit Surprised", where the cook is instructed, after roasting, to "draw out the jaw-bones and stick them in the eyes to appear like horns".
 
Colquhoun admires Raffald's turn of phrase, such as the advice to reserve water from a raised-pie pastry, as "it makes the crust sad". Shipperbottom highlights Raffald's phrases such as "dry salt will candy and shine like diamonds on your bacon", and that wine "summer-beams and blinks in the tub" if barm is not added in time.
 
According to the lexicographer John Ayto, Raffald was the first writer to provide a recipe for crumpets; she provided an early recipe in English cuisine for cooking yams, and an early reference to barbecuing. Ahead of her time, she was a proponent of adding wine to dishes while there was still cooking time left, "to take off the rawness, for nothing can give a made dish a more disagreeable taste than raw wine or fresh anchovy".

Directory

Raffald published three editions of The Manchester Directory, in 1772, 1773 and 1781. To compile the listing, she sent "proper and intelligent Persons round the Town, to take down the Name, Business, and place of Abode of every Gentleman, Tradesman, and Shop-keeper, as well as others whose Business or Employment has any tendency to public Notice". The historian Hannah Barker, in her examination of businesswomen in northern England, observes that this process could take weeks or months to complete. The work was divided into two sections: first, a list of the town's traders and the civic elite, in alphabetical order; second, a list of Manchester's major religious, trade, philanthropic and governmental organisations and entities.
 
Raffald did not list her shop under her own name, but it was recorded under that of her husband, as "John Raffald Seedsman and Confectioner"; Barker observes that this was different from Raffald's usual approach, as her shop and book were both advertised under her own name. The Directory contains listings of 94 women in trade—only 6 per cent of the total listings; of those, 46 were listed as widows, which the historian Margaret Hunt considers "a suspiciously large proportion".
 
Historians have used Raffald's Directory to study the role of women in business in the 18th century. Barker warns of potential drawbacks with the material, including that only women trading independently of their families, or those who were widowed or single, were likely to be listed, but any woman who traded in partnership with her husband—such as Raffald—would be listed under her husband's name. Hunt points out that there are no keepers of lodging houses listed; directories that cover other towns list significant numbers, but the category is absent from Raffald's work.

Legacy

Baldwin brought out the eighth edition of The Experienced English Housekeeper shortly after Raffald died. Throughout her life she had refused to have her portrait painted, but Baldwin included an engraving of her in this edition, wearing a headdress that one of her daughters had made. The Experienced English Housekeeper was a popular book and remained in print for nearly fifty years. Fifteen authorised editions of her book were published and twenty-three pirated ones: the last edition appeared in 1810. Along with Hannah Glasse's 1747 work The Art of Cookery Made Plain and Easy and Eliza Smith's The Compleat Housewife (1727), The Experienced English Housekeeper was one of the cookery books popular in colonial America. Copies had been taken over by travellers and "The Experienced Housekeeper" was printed there.
 
Raffald's work was plagiarised heavily throughout the rest of the 18th and 19th century; the historian Gilly Lehman writes that Raffald was one of the most copied cookery book writers of the century. Writers who copied Raffald's work include Isabella Beeton, in her bestselling Mrs Beeton's Book of Household Management (1861); Mary Cole's 1789 work The Lady's Complete Guide; Richard Briggs's 1788 book The English Art of Cookery; The Universal Cook (1773) by John Townshend; Mary Smith's The Complete House-keeper and Professed Cook (1772); and John Farley's 1783 book The London Art of Cookery.
 
Handwritten copies of individual recipes have been located in family recipe books around England, and Queen Victoria copied several of Raffald's recipes, including one for "King Solomon's Temple in Flummery", when she was a princess.
 
Ayto states that Raffald was possibly the person who invented the Eccles cake. The food writer Alan Davidson observes that Raffald's recipe—for "sweet patties"—was the basis from which the Eccles cake was later developed. Raffald also played an important role in the development of the wedding cake. Hers was the first recipe for a "Bride Cake" that is recognisable as a modern wedding cake. Although cakes had been a traditional part of nuptials, her version differed from previous recipes by the use of what is now called royal icing over a layer of almond paste or icing. Simon Charsley, in the Encyclopedia of Food and Culture, considers that Raffald's basis for her cake "became the distinguishing formula for British celebration cakes of increasing variety" over the next century.
 
Raffald has been admired by several modern cooks and food writers. The 20th-century cookery writer Elizabeth David references Raffald several times in her articles, collected in Is There a Nutmeg in the House, which includes a recipe for apricot ice cream. In her 1984 book, An Omelette and a Glass of Wine, David includes Raffald's recipes for potted ham with chicken, potted salmon, and lemon syllabub. In English Bread and Yeast Cookery (1977), David includes recipes for crumpets, barm pudding, "wegg" (caraway seed cake) and bath buns. The food writer Jane Grigson admired Raffald's work, and in her 1974 book English Food, she included five of Raffald's recipes: bacon and egg pie (a quiche lorraine with a pastry lid); "whet" (anchovy fillets and cheese on toast); potted ham with chicken; crème brûlée; and orange custards.
 
Raffald is quoted around 270 times in the Oxford English Dictionary, including for the terms "bride cake", "gofer-tongs", "hedgehog soup" and "Hottentot pie". A blue plaque marked the site of the Bulls Head pub which Raffald ran. It was damaged in the 1996 Manchester bombing and replaced in 2011 on the Marks & Spencer Building, Exchange Square.
 
In 2013 Arley Hall introduced some of Raffald's recipes into the menu at the hall's restaurant, which caters for public visitors. Steve Hamilton, Arley Hall's general manager stated that Raffald is "a huge character in Arley's history and it is only right that we mark her contribution to the estate's past". Arley Hall considers Raffald "the Delia Smith of the 18th century".

Notes and references

Notes

References

Sources

Books

Journals

News

Internet

External links
 
 
 

 

 

 

1733 births
1781 deaths
18th-century English women writers
18th-century English writers
People from Doncaster
Women cookbook writers
18th-century English businesswomen
18th-century English businesspeople